Claudi Martí (born 6 March 1940 in Carcassonne, Aude) is an Occitan singer from the Carcassonne region in Occitania. He was one of the main figures of Nòva cançon in the 1970s.

Discography 

 Occitània! (1969)
 Lengadòc roge (1971)
 Montsegur! (1972)
 Marti (1972)
 Lo país que vòl viure (1973)
 L'òme esper (1974)
 L'an 01 (1975)
 Lo camin del solelh (1976)
 Monta vida (1980)
 Et pourtant elle tourne... (1992)
 El jinete (2002)
 Ço Milhor (2006)
 Tolosa (2008)

Bibliography 
 Homme d'Oc (1974)
 Claude Marti (1974)
 Caminarem (1978)
 Les petites Espagnes (1984)
 Ombres et lumière (1998)
 Carcassone (1998)
 Corbières au cœur (1998)
 Trencavel (1999)
 Carcassonne au cœur (1999)
 Minervois au cœur (2002)
 L'Olivier ou la résurrection de l'éternel (2003)

External links
  Official site

1940 births
Living people
People from Carcassonne
Occitan-language singers
20th-century French male singers